Baah is a surname. Notable people with the surname include:

Rebop Kwaku Baah (1944–1983), Ghanaian-Swedish musician
Kofi Baah (born 1998), Ghanaian professional footballer
Kwadwo Baah (born 2003), German-English footballer
Kwame Baah (born 1938), Ghanaian soldier and government official